A china doll is a doll made of glazed porcelain.

China doll or China Doll may also refer to:

Literature
China Doll (play), a 2015 play by David Mamet
China Dolls (novel), a 2014 novel by Lisa See
The China Doll, a 1964 novel

Music
 "China Doll" (song), a 1952 song by Slim Whitman
"China Doll" (Julian Cope song), 1988
"China Doll", a song by the Grateful Dead from the album From the Mars Hotel
China Doll (band), a British pop duo
China Dolls, a Thai pop duo

Other uses
A stereotype of East and Southeast Asians in the United States reflecting hypersexuality and submissiveness
In human trafficking in Malaysia, the nickname of female Chinese nationals
Radermachera sinica, an evergreen tree native to China and Taiwan
China Doll (brand), an Alabama-based brand of rice and beans
China Doll (film), a 1957 film starring Victor Mature

See also
China (disambiguation)
Chyna Doll (disambiguation)